(born 1968 in Kumamoto city, Japan) is a Japanese CGI animation director. Some of his prominent works include Mr. Stain, Popee the Performer and Funny Pets. He has been known to be active in both his native Kumamoto and Okinawa.

Works

References

External links
 About Ryuji Masuda 
 Ryuji Masuda anime at Media Arts Database 

1968 births
Living people
Japanese animators
Japanese animated film directors
People from Kumamoto
Osaka University of Arts alumni